Wessel Jacobus Wessels (Harrismith, Orange Free State, 27 April 1865 – Reitz, Orange Free State, 19 January 1945) was a Boer general during the Anglo Boer War (1899–1902). He was one of the eleven children of Hermanus Nicolaas ("Bont Hermaans") Wessels (Grahamstown, 8 October 1822 – Harrismith, 18 February 1886) and Johanna Wilhelmina Elizabeth Catharina Wessels (birth place unknown, 14 June 1833 – buried at Harrismith, died 4 April 1921). He wed Susanna Magdalena Wessels (birth place unknown, 2 December 1871 – death place and date unknown) and had five daughters and four sons by her.

Boer War
At the outbreak of the war Wessels was sent to the front in the Colony of Natal with his Harrismith Commando. He participated in the Boer victory of the Battle of Sanna's Post (Sannaspos, 31 March 1900) with his own troops, combined with those of general Froneman and general Piet de Wet. Their total of 1,150 men had dug in in the Modder River bank. Later he fought in Orange Free State under general Marthinus Prinsloo. When Prinsloo surrendered to British general Archibald Hunter in the Brandwater Basin with some 4300 troops on 30 July 1900, Wessels managed to escape. 

He was subsequently promoted to commander of the Harrismith Commando. In February 1901 Wessels joined general Christiaan de Wet in his invasion of the Cape Colony. In March 1901 he became assistant commander of the Vrede district, as one of the seven assistant commanders in Orange Free State. Later, in the night of 3 September 1901 Wessels crossed the Orange River with general Jan Smuts at Kiba Drift to invade the Eastern Cape again, after the failed raids of Christiaan de Wet, J. B. M. Hertzog and Pieter Hendrik Kritzinger. According to British counterinsurgency field intelligence of general French, Wessels commanded some 200 men, as one of seven separate Boer commands invading the Cape in September 1901 with a combined strength of about a thousand troops. In this final year of the war Wessels and his men fought several skirmishes with British forces but they evaded their large clean up operations.

He was one of the sixty Boer delegates at the Treaty of Vereeniging and voted for the peace. Wessels died on 19 January 1945 in Reitz, Free State.

Literature 
 M. P. Bossenbroek, Yvette Rosenberg (Translator), The Boer War, Seven Stories Press, New York, NY, 2018. ISBN 9781609807474, 1609807472.
 
 J. E. H. Grobler, The War Reporter: the Anglo-Boer war through the eyes of the burghers, Johannesburg: Jonathan Ball Publishers, 2004. ISBN 978-1-86842-186-2. Pages 100, 107,132, 137, and 149.
 Thomas Pakenham, The Boer War, George Weidenfeld & Nicolson, London, 1979. Abacus, 1992. ISBN 0 349 10466 2. Pages 393, 519, and 526.

References

 
1865 births
1945 deaths
Afrikaner people
Boer generals
Orange Free State generals
Orange Free State military personnel of the Second Boer War
People of the Second Boer War